The Paducah Chiefs are a collegiate summer baseball team in Paducah, Kentucky. They are a member of the Ohio Valley League. The Chiefs has been the primary nickname for various Paducah teams, who began play in 1897.

Early incarnations of the Paducah Chiefs played in the Kentucky–Illinois–Tennessee League (KITTY League) in 1903 and 1912–1913, and in the Mississippi–Ohio Valley League in 1949–1950. The Chiefs competed in the KITTY League from 1951 until their disbanding in 1955.

The Chiefs, though finishing fourth in the regular season standings in 1949, went on to win the Mississippi–Ohio Valley League playoffs and championship.  In 1950 the Chiefs again finished fourth in the regular season standings, but made through the playoffs to the league championship series against the Centralia Sterlings; the championship series was cancelled due to bad weather.  After that season the Chiefs left the Mississippi–Ohio Valley League for the KITTY League.

The Chiefs were the 1955 Kentucky–Illinois–Tennessee League (KITTY League) champions with a 64–39 record, and were the league runner up in 1952 (67–53).

The franchise was affiliated with the St. Louis Cardinals (1952-1955),  Brooklyn Dodgers (1939), St. Louis Cardinals (1938), Pittsburgh Pirates (1937) and Cincinnati Reds (1936).

The team was also known as the Paducah Indians for much of its history.

The Modern Era 
In 1996, Dr. Frank "Doc" Hideg and a group of volunteers resurrected Brooks Stadium. It proved to be a vital step in bringing amateur baseball back to Paducah, as in 2015, the Brooks Stadium Commission was approached by the Ohio Valley League about adding a team in Paducah. Under the leadership of General Manager Greg McKeel and Brooks Stadium Commission President Doc Hideg, the Chiefs returned to Brooks Stadium in Paducah in the summer of 2016.

The ballparks
The franchise played at numerous parks in Paducah.

From 1949 to 1955 Paducah teams played at Brooks Stadium, located at 25th Street and C Street, now 2400 Brooks Stadium Drive. Brooks Stadium hosted the Mississippi-Ohio Valley League All-Star Game in 1949. The ballpark has remained in use to this day as the baseball home for the nearby Paducah Tilghman High School.

Earlier, the team played at Hook's Park, located at 8th street and Terrell, from 1935 to 1941. In 1922 and 1923 Paducah played at League Park. Early teams played at Wallace Park located at Broadway and Labelle.

Notable alumni

 Alan Roden (2019) 2022 MLB Draft selection
 Tom Baker (1955)
 Jim McKnight (1955)
 Marty Kutyna (1953)
 Gene Green (1952)
 Jim Frey (1950) Mgr: 1980 AL Pennant - Kansas City Royals
 Eddie Kearse (1949)
 Billy Queen (1949)
 Charlie Biggs (1941)
 Ben Tincup (1937, 1939, 1941) Pitched into his 40s with Paducah; Native American Pioneer; longtime MLB Coach, Scout
 Dave Koslo (1940) 1949 NL ERA Leader
 Ed Wright (1940)
 Bill Burich (1939)
 Dutch McCall (1939)
 Dave Bartosch (1938)
 Augie Bergamo (1938)
 Ray Sanders (1938)
 Erv Brame (1937)
 Frankie Gustine (1937) 3 x MLB AS
 Hugh McMullen (1937)
 Jim Pruett (1937)
 Joe Grace (1935)
 Ollie Pickering (1922)
 Hank DeBerry (1914)
 Art Brouthers (1912-1913)
 Walt Marbet (1912)
 Dixie Carroll (1910-1911)
 Cowboy Jones (1911)
 Lew Groh (1906)
 Fred Miller (1906)
 Wiley Piatt (1905-1906)
 Grover Land (1904-1906)
 Harry Vahrenhorst (1906)
 Pete Dowling (1897)
 Jim Jones (1897)
 Frank Pears (1897)
 Willie Sudhoff (1897)

References

External links
Baseball Reference

Defunct baseball teams in Kentucky
Kentucky-Illinois-Tennessee League
St. Louis Cardinals minor league affiliates
Brooklyn Dodgers minor league affiliates
Cincinnati Reds minor league affiliates
Pittsburgh Pirates minor league affiliates
Paducah, Kentucky
Mississippi-Ohio Valley League
Defunct minor league baseball teams
1897 establishments in Kentucky
1955 disestablishments in Kentucky
Baseball teams established in 1897
Baseball teams disestablished in 1955
Kentucky-Illinois-Tennessee League teams